Bârsău may refer to several places in Romania:

Bârsău, a commune in Satu Mare County, composed of Bârsău de Jos and Bârsău de Sus villages
Bârsău, a village in Hărău Commune, Hunedoara County
Bârsău Mare, a village in Gâlgău Commue, Sălaj County
Bârsău (river), a tributary of the Someș in Maramureș County

See also
 Bârsești (disambiguation)
 Bârsa, name of two villages in Romania
 Bârsana, name of two villages in Romania
 Bârsănești, name of two villages in Romania
 Bârsoiu, a village in Vâlcea County, Romania
 Bârsăuța, a village in Sălaj County, Romania

Family name:
 Bârsănescu — search for "Bârsănescu"